La Tinguiña District is one of fourteen districts of the province Ica in Peru.

References

1961 establishments in Peru
States and territories established in 1961